Sarriguren is a locality located in the municipality of Valle de Egüés, in Navarre province, Spain, Spain. As of 2020, it has a population of 15665. Sarriguren is the capital of the municipality of Valle de Egüés.

Geography 

References

Populated places in Navarre